Westbrook is a town in Middlesex County, Connecticut, United States. The population was 6,769 at the 2020 census. The town center is classified by the U.S. Census Bureau as a census-designated place (CDP).

Geography
Westbrook lies in the shoreline area of the state. The town is bordered by the towns of Essex, Clinton, Deep River, and Old Saybrook, where the Connecticut River empties into Long Island Sound. The Salt Meadow Unit of the Stewart B. McKinney National Wildlife Refuge is located in town.

Westbrook encompasses three islands in Long Island Sound, all of which are uninhabited.  Salt Island is the easternmost and smallest, at approximately 0.9 acres. Menunketesuck Island, which is the largest of Westbrook's islands at approximately 4.6 acres, extends into the Sound from the outlet of the Menunketesuck and Patchogue Rivers and is part of the Stewart B. McKinney National Wildlife Refuge.  Further west is Duck Island, measuring approximately 3.6 acres.

Private beach Associations in the town are: Chapman Beach, Coral Sands, Grove Beach Point, Grove Beach Terrace, Horse Hill, Island View, Kelsey Point, Little Stannard, Middle Beach, Pilot's Point, Pointina, Quotonset Beach, Sagamore Terrace, Salt Works, Stannard Beach, West Beach.

History
Westbrook was incorporated in 1840.

Demographics

At the 2000 census there were 6,292 people, 2,605 households, and 1,693 families living in the town. The racial makeup of the town was 95.76% White, 0.70% African American, 0.13% Native American, 1.56% Asian, 0.11% Pacific Islander, 0.72% from other races, and 1.03% from two or more races. Hispanic or Latino of any race were 2.51%.

Of the 2,605 households 26.5% had children under the age of 18 living with them, 54.1% were married couples living together, 7.8% had a female householder with no husband present, and 35.0% were non-families. 28.0% of households were one person and 12.7% were one person aged 65 or older.  The average household size was 2.39 and the average family size was 2.93.

The age distribution was 21.8% under the age of 18, 5.2% from 18 to 24, 29.2% from 25 to 44, 26.7% from 45 to 64, and 17.1% 65 or older.  The median age was 42 years. For every 100 females, there were 95.8 males.  For every 100 females age 18 and over, there were 92.7 males.

The median household income was $57,531 and the median family income  was $71,344. Males had a median income of $46,889 versus $32,227 for females. The per capita income for the town was $28,680.  About 2.7% of families and 5.2% of the population were below the poverty line, including 3.7% of those under age 18 and 8.1% of those age 65 or over.

CDP
At the 2000 census, there were 2,238 people, 1,052 households, and 551 families living in the Westbrook Center CDP. The racial makeup of the CDP was 94.50% White, 1.39% African American, 0.09% Native American, 2.19% Asian, 0.63% from other races, and 1.21% from two or more races. Hispanic or Latino of any race were 2.19% of the population.

Of the 1,052 households 18.5% had children under the age of 18 living with them, 40.9% were married couples living together, 8.7% had a female householder with no husband present, and 47.6% were non-families. 37.9% of households were one person and 16.8% were one person aged 65 or older. The average household size was 2.09 and the average family size was 2.71.

The age distribution was 16.1% under the age of 18, 6.9% from 18 to 24, 28.9% from 25 to 44, 25.7% from 45 to 64, and 22.4% 65 or older. The median age was 44 years. For every 100 females, there were 92.6 males. For every 100 females age 18 and over, there were 90.1 males.

The median household income was $45,385 and the median family income  was $59,375. Males had a median income of $40,707 versus $31,250 for females. The per capita income for the CDP was $29,866. About 3.7% of families and 6.6% of the population were below the poverty line, including 6.7% of those under age 18 and 7.2% of those age 65 or over.

Education

The town's public education needs are overseen by its local school district, Westbrook Public Schools. Westbrook's public elementary school, the Daisy Ingraham Elementary School, was the recipient of a Blue Ribbon honor for excellence for 1998–1999.  A new middle school, connected to the high school, Westbrook High School, opened in 2005.

Oxford Academy, an all-boys boarding school, has been located in Westbrook since 1973.

Infrastructure

Emergency services
The town of Westbrook is the home of Connecticut State Police Troop F, located on Interstate 95 and Spencer Plains Road.  Police services in Westbrook are coordinated by a Resident State Trooper and several Police Constables.  Constables patrol during the day and evening hours while overnight patrol is provided by the State Police.

Fire protection is provided by the Westbrook Fire Department (a.k.a. Westbrook Chemical Engine Company), located on South Main Street.  This all-volunteer department is responsible for response to alarms of fire, rescue emergencies and medical emergencies.  Emergency Medical Services are provided by the Westbrook Ambulance Association, a paid-on-call basic life support service.  Paramedic services are provided by Middlesex Hospital from their satellite facility in Essex, CT.

Transportation
Westbrook (Shore Line East station) is a station along the Shore Line East commuter line.

The Estuary Transit District provides public bus transportation throughout Westbrook and the surrounding towns through its 9 Town Transit Service.  Services include connections to the Old Saybrook Train Station which is served by Amtrak in addition to the Shore Line East railroad.

Notable people

 Everett Bacon (1890–1989), athlete and World War I veteran was born in town
 David Bushnell (1740–1824), American inventor who built the first submarine ever used in combat
 Art Carney (1918–2003), American actor and comedian
 George Lessey (1879–1947), silent movie actor lived his later years and died in Westbrook

References

External links

Town government Web site
Town library Web site

 
Towns in Middlesex County, Connecticut
Populated coastal places in Connecticut
Towns in Connecticut